Misc. Sessions is an EP by Rob Dougan, an Australian composer, in preparation for a new album, recorded at Abbey Road Studios and featuring a 10-piece chamber string section alongside a larger 50-piece orchestra, and five new songs. It was released on October 23, 2016 on Gumroad.

Track listing

References

External links
Misc. Sessions on Gumroad

Rob Dougan albums
2016 albums